Karim Rasheed Mayfield (born December 14, 1980) is an American professional boxer who fights at welterweight. He is a former NABO junior welterweight champion.

Early years
Mayfield was born and raised in San Francisco and grew up in the historic Fillmore District. He has three brothers and two sisters. His mother is an entrepreneur while his father is an electrician.

Amateur career

Karim Mayfield has fought 58 amateur fights altogether with a record of 54-4. He won the 2006 Golden Gloves in San Francisco at the historic Civic Center Auditorium in San Francisco. Mayfield also won the Bronze medal in the Western Trials for the 2004 Olympics.

Mayfield was a football player, running back, in school and discovered boxing at a relatively late age when he was 20 years old. There was a local gym around his neighborhood that had just opened and he decided to go check it out. Mayfield ended up sparring with an amateur boxer who had been boxing for a year and did extremely well. That inspired and motivated Mayfield to take up Boxing professionally. Mayfield is trained by Ben Bautista.

Pro career
On June 23, 2006 Mayfield beat the veteran Chris Mickle to win his pro debut. This card also had future world champions Robert Guerrero and Andre Dirrell.

Mayfield first won the Vacant NABO Jr. Welterweight on October 1, 2011 in Tunica, Mississippi, via a 10 round unanimous decision against lefthanded former two-time Venezuelan Olympian Patrick Lopez (20-4).

On June 20, 2015 Floyd Mayweather Jr told ESPN Boxing reporter Dan Rafael that he was going to fight either Karim Mayfield or Andre Berto next. Most boxing scribes did not take this seriously, but Mayweather insisted that he was not joking, stating "Pacquiao fought (Chris) Algieri, so why not?"

Professional boxing record

|- style="margin:0.5em auto; font-size:95%;"
|align="center" colspan=8|21 Wins (11 knockouts, 10 decisions), 5 Losses (0 knockouts, 5 decisions), 1 Draw|- style="margin:0.5em auto; font-size:95%;"
|align=center style="border-style: none none solid solid; background: #e3e3e3"|Res.|align=center style="border-style: none none solid solid; background: #e3e3e3"|Record|align=center style="border-style: none none solid solid; background: #e3e3e3"|Opponent|align=center style="border-style: none none solid solid; background: #e3e3e3"|Type|align=center style="border-style: none none solid solid; background: #e3e3e3"|Rd., Time|align=center style="border-style: none none solid solid; background: #e3e3e3"|Date|align=center style="border-style: none none solid solid; background: #e3e3e3"|Location|align=center style="border-style: none none solid solid; background: #e3e3e3"|Notes|-align=center
|Loss || 21-5-1 ||align=left| Sergey Lubkovich
||| 10||   || align=left|
|align=left|
|-align=center
|Win || 21-4-1 ||align=left| Gaku Takahashi
||| 8||   || align=left|
|align=left|
|-align=center
|Win || 20-4-1 ||align=left| Miguel Dumas
||| 6||   || align=left|
|align=left|
|-align=center
|Loss || 19-4-1 ||align=left| Bakhtiyar Eyubov
||| 10||   || align=left|
|align=left|
|-align=center
|Loss || 19-3-1 ||align=left| Dmitry Mikhaylenko
||| 10||   || align=left|
|align=left|
|-align=center
|Win || 19-2-1 ||align=left| Michael Balasi
||| 8||   || align=left|  
|align=left|
|-align=center
|Loss || 18-2-1 ||align=left| Emanuel Taylor
||| 10||   || align=left|  
|align=left|
|-align=center
|Loss || 18-1-1 ||align=left| Thomas Dulorme
||| 10||   || align=left|  
|align=left| 
|-align=center
|Win || 18-0-1 ||align=left| Christopher Fernandez
||| 8,2:59||   || align=left|  
|align=left|
|-align=center
|Win || 17-0-1 ||align=left| Mauricio Herrera
||| 10||   || align=left|  
|align=left| 
|-align=center
|Win || 16-0-1 ||align=left| Raymond Serrano
||| 5,0:47||   || align=left|  
|align=left|
|-align=center
|Win || 15-0-1 ||align=left| Patrick Lopez
||| 10||   || align=left|  
|align=left|
|-align=center
|Win || 14-0-1 ||align=left| Stevie Forbes
||| 10,1:03||   || align=left|  
|align=left|
|-align=center
|Win || 13-0-1 ||align=left| Sergio Joel De La Torre
||| 5,3:00||   || align=left|  
|align=left|
|-align=center
|Win || 12-0-1 ||align=left| Mario Ramos
||| 6||   || align=left|  
|align=left|
|-align=center
|Win || 11-0-1 ||align=left| Francisco Santana
||| 5,2:27||   || align=left|  
|align=left|
|-align=center
|Win || 10-0-1 ||align=left| Joshua Rentería
||| 6||   || align=left|  
|align=left|
|-align=center
|Win || 9-0-1 ||align=left| Roberto Valenzuela
||| 2,1:12||   || align=left|  
|align=left|
|-align=center
|Win || 8-0-1 ||align=left| Mario Alberto Lozano
||| 6||   || align=left|  
|align=left|
|-align=center
|Win || 7-0-1 ||align=left| Trenton Titsworth
||| 4||   || align=left|  
|align=left|
|-align=center
|Win || 6-0-1 ||align=left| Francisco Santana
||| 6||   || align=left|  
|align=left|
|-align=center
|Win || 5-0-1 ||align=left| Rahman Yusubov
||| 2,2:47||   || align=left|  
|align=left|
|-align=center
|Win || 4-0-1 ||align=left| Alejo Sepulveda
||| 1,2:46||   || align=left|  
|align=left|
|-align=center
|Win || 3-0-1 ||align=left| Ricardo Galindo
||| 4,1:56||   || align=left|  
|align=left|
|-align=center
|style="background: #dae2f1"|Draw || 2-0-1 ||align=left| Jorge Alberto Padilla
||| 2,3:00||   || align=left|  
|align=left|
|-align=center
|Win || 2-0-0 ||align=left| Salvador Lopez
||| 3,2:29||   || align=left|  
|align=left|
|-align=center
|Win || 1-0-0 ||align=left| Chris Mickle
||| 1,'''1:00||   || align=left|  
|align=left|

References

External links

1980 births
Welterweight boxers
Living people
American male boxers
Boxers from San Francisco
African-American boxers
21st-century African-American sportspeople
20th-century African-American people